Hale Chapel is a Unitarian chapel in Hale Barns, Greater Manchester. The chapel was built in 1723 and was originally a Presbyterian meeting house. A vestry was added c1880 and around the same time alterations were made to the rest of the building. The chapel features an 18th-century pulpit and 19th century stained glass. Hale Chapel is the earliest place of worship in either Hale or Hale Barns.

See also
Listed buildings in Hale, Greater Manchester
Grade II* listed buildings in Greater Manchester
Listed buildings in Hale, Greater Manchester
www.halechapel.co.uk

References

Churches completed in 1723
Grade II* listed buildings in Greater Manchester
Churches in Trafford
1723 establishments in England
Unitarian chapels in England